The Beckford Trust is a multi-academy trust, with 10 academies based in Bradford, West Yorkshire.

Description
As an academy, Beckfoot School is the founding school of the Beckfoot Trust, a multi-academy trust. Hazelbeck School joined the trust in 2013 and Beckfoot Upper Heaton in 2015. Beckfoot Thornton joined in 2016. Former headteacher, David Horn, is the head of the Beckfoot Trust and was replaced with Gillian Halls as headteacher, Ms. Halls has since joined, Mr. Horn is currently running the Beckfoot Trust. She has been replaced by Mr. Simon Wade, former headteacher of Beckfoot Upper-Heaton.

Schools
 Beckfoot School  
 Hazelbeck Special Educational Prevision 
 Beckfoot Upper Heaton  
 Beckfoot Allerton Primary School and Nursery  
 Beckfoot Heaton Primary  143094 
 Beckfoot Oakbank  
 Beckfoot Thornton  
 Beckfoot Priestthorpe Primary School & Nursery  
 Beckfoot Phoenix  
 Beckfoot Nessfield

References

Academy trusts